Zábrodí is a municipality and village in Náchod District in the Hradec Králové Region of the Czech Republic. It has about 600 inhabitants.

Administrative parts
The village of Horní Rybníky and the area of Končiny are administrative parts of Zábrodí.

References

Villages in Náchod District